Chic means fashionably "stylish" or "smart".

Chic may also refer to:

Arts and entertainment

Music
 Chic (band), an American disco and funk music group
 Chic (album), the 1977 debut album of the band
 Chic Chocolate (1916–1967), stage name of Goan trumpeter and composer Antonio Xavier Vaz

Other arts and entertainment
 Chic!, a 2015 French romantic comedy film
 CHIC-FM, a Canadian radio station in Quebec
 CHIC, former callsign (1960–1977) of CIAO (AM), a Canadian radio station in Ontario
 Chic (magazine), women lifestyle magazine established in 2012 
 Chic (pornographic magazine), a defunct pornographic magazine started by Larry Flynt in 1976
 Chic (women's magazine), a defunct British monthly magazine aimed at young black women established in 1984

Other uses 
Chic (nickname), nickname for people named Charles
 Chic (automobile), an automobile manufactured in Australia in the early 1920s
 Chic (horse), a thoroughbred racehorse
 Cooking and Hospitality Institute of Chicago

See also

Chi (disambiguation)
CHI (disambiguation)
Chia (disambiguation)
Chica (disambiguation)
Chick (disambiguation)
Chico (disambiguation)
Chik (disambiguation)
Chin (disambiguation)
Chip (disambiguation)
Chir (disambiguation)
Chiu (disambiguation)

Lists of people by nickname